Reginald Derrick Matthews (20 December 1933 – 7 October 2001) was an English footballer who played as a goalkeeper. He was the most expensive goalkeeper at the time he signed for Chelsea in 1956 for £22,000.

Club career
In a playing career spanning almost 20 years, Matthews turned out for Coventry City, Chelsea and Derby County, making over 100 league appearances for each. He was selected to play for the Third Division South team against the North in 1955–56 and 1956–57.

International career
Matthews won four caps for the England under-23's, and five caps for the senior national team. He is one of only five post-war players to be capped while playing for a Third Division club.

Honours 
 Coventry City Hall of Fame

References

1933 births
2001 deaths
English footballers
Association football goalkeepers
England international footballers
England under-23 international footballers
English Football League representative players
English Football League players
Coventry City F.C. players
Chelsea F.C. players
Derby County F.C. players
Rugby Town F.C. (1945) players
Footballers from Coventry